Theila metallosticha is a moth in the family Crambidae. It was described by Turner in 1938. It is found in Australia, where it has been recorded from Queensland.

References

Acentropinae
Moths described in 1938
Moths of Australia